Hota Station is the name of two train stations in Japan:

 Hota Station (Chiba)
 Hota Station (Fukui)